Ramavarappadu railway station is an Indian Railway station in Vijayawada of Andhra Pradesh. It is situated on Vijayawada–Nidadavolu loop line of Howrah–Chennai main line and is administered by Vijayawada railway division of South Coast Railway zone. It is categorized as a Non-Suburban Grade-6 (NSG-6) station in the division. It is an important station alongside Ramavarappadu, for devotees during the annual Mary Matha festival, celebrated at Gunadala hill shrine in the city.

Classification 
In terms of earnings and outward passengers handled, Ramavarappadu is categorized as a Non-Suburban Grade-6 (NSG-6) railway station. Based on the re–categorization of Indian Railway stations for the period of 2017–18 and 2022–23, an NSG–6 category station earns nearly  crore and handles close to  passengers.

References 

Railway stations in Vijayawada railway division
Railway stations in Krishna district